Robby Ginepri was the defending champion, but lost to Andy Roddick in the semifinals.

James Blake won in the final 4–6, 6–4, 7–6(7–5), against Andy Roddick.

Seeds
All seeds receive a bye into the second round.

Draw

Finals

Top half

Section 1

Section 2

Bottom half

Section 3

Section 4

References
Main draw
Qualifying draw

Singles